Sungji Hong (b. 1973) is a South Korean composer. Her work Missa Lumen de Lumine, a setting of the Roman-rite Catholic Mass ordinary for three voices, was written for Trio Mediæval in 2002. The trio recorded it in 2005. In a review for The Gramophone, Ivan Moody found it "rather a fragmentary affair", though with "some dazzling moments".

References

External links
 Official website

South Korean classical composers
21st-century classical composers
Living people
Year of birth missing (living people)